Zakon! is a Croatian sitcom, produced by Interfilm and originally aired in 2009 by Croatian Radiotelevision, a satirical comedy about police business in a fictional Croatian backcountry with elements of the absurd, combined with references to real life. Because of its numerous references to real people that were deemed to be too offensive, several episodes were edited to have certain plot elements visually censored, despite the fact the original script was accepted as such at a public tender.

Cast and crew
 Director: Ivan Goran Vitez
 Screenwriters: Tonči Kožul, Zoran Lazić
 Actors:
 Stojan Matavulj as Zdravko Maček
 Robert Ugrina as Mateo Ćirić
 Nenad Cvetko as Zvonimir Krmpotić
 Sven Šestak as Duško
 Ines Bojanić as Rajna
 Angel Palašev as Mayor Slavko
 Ivica Pucar as Denis Miloglav
 Luka Peroš as Brat Teofil

References

External links
 

2009 Croatian television series debuts
2009 Croatian television series endings
Croatian comedy television series
2000s satirical television series
2010s black comedy television series
Croatian Radiotelevision original programming